Sergey Viktorovich Altukhov (born 23 February 1982, Orsk, Orenburg Oblast) is a Russian political figure, deputy of the 8th State Duma convocation. From 2004 to 2015, he occupied various positions in the Russian branches of international IT companies, including Microsoft and SAP. In 2015 he became a Deputy Governor of Krasnodar Krai. In 2021 he was elected to the State Duma of the 8th convocation, running from the United Russia. He represents the Tuapse constituency.

Sergey Altukhov is married and has two children.

References

1982 births
Living people
People from Orsk
United Russia politicians
21st-century Russian politicians
Eighth convocation members of the State Duma (Russian Federation)